The Gazeta Sporturilor Monthly Football Awards are association football awards presented monthly by Romania's largest and most read sports-related publication, Gazeta Sporturilor. They were first awarded in September 2021, and they honour players and managers deemed to have been the best over the previous month in Romania.

The award is not affiliated with the country's top flight competition, the Liga I—instead, the voters can also choose between Romanian players and coaches who are competing abroad. Foreign footballers and coaches in Romania are eligible as well.

List of winners

Player of the Month

Manager of the Month

Multiple winners

Awards won by nationality

Awards won by position

Awards won by club

See also
Gazeta Sporturilor Romanian Footballer of the Year
Gazeta Sporturilor Foreign Player of the Year in Romania
Gazeta Sporturilor Romania Coach of the Year

Notes

References

External links
Gazeta Sporturilor official website 

Romanian football trophies and awards
 
Awards established in 2021
2021 establishments in Romania
Association football player non-biographical articles